George Ryga (27 July 1932 – 18 November 1987) was a Canadian playwright, actor and novelist.  His writings explored the experiences of Indigenous peoples in Canada, among other themes. His most famous work is The Ecstasy of Rita Joe.

Early years
Ryga was born in Deep Creek near Athabasca, Alberta to poor Ukrainian immigrant parents. Unable to continue his schooling past grade six, he worked at a variety of jobs, including radio copywriter. Ryga continued to study, taking correspondence courses, and winning a scholarship to the Banff School of Fine Arts. In 1955, he traveled to Europe, where he attended the World Assembly for Peace in Helsinki and worked for the BBC. The following year he returned to Canada.

Career
While living in Edmonton, he published his first book, Song of My Hands (1956), a collection of poems.

Ryga's first play, Indian, was performed on television in 1961. He achieved national exposure with The Ecstasy of Rita Joe in 1967. The work, considered by many to be the most important English-language play by a Canadian playwright, is the story of a young native woman arriving in the city who finds that she has no place with either her own people or the white man. It was performed in Vancouver, at the National Arts Centre in Ottawa and in Washington state. In 1971, the work was performed as a ballet by the Royal Winnipeg Ballet.

Other plays by Ryga include:
 Captives of the Faceless Drummer - 1971
 Sunrise on Sarah - 1972
 Portrait of Angelica - 1973
 Ploughmen of the Glacier - 1977
 In the Shadow of the Vulture - 1985
 Paracelsus - 1986
 Summerland - 1992

He made a significant contribution to popular music when he wrote lyrics for a series of songs composed by the members of the Vancouver-based band The Collectors for the soundtrack of his 1969 play Grass and Wild Strawberries.  Early Morning, the single release from the resulting Grass & Wild Strawberries album, became a minor local hit, and the showstopping album track Seventeenth Summer was re-recorded by the band after it underwent a membership change and changed its name to Chilliwack. The distinctive track, strongly influenced by First Nations musical forms, became a signature tune in live shows by Chilliwack for many years afterward.

Death
He died in Summerland, British Columbia in 1987.  His home was turned into the George Ryga Centre, an arts and culture centre, which existed until 2012 when it closed due to financial challenges. It is now in private hands.

Recognition
A biography, The Ecstasy of Resistance, by James Hoffman, was published in 1995.

Since 2004, the George Ryga Award for Social Awareness in Literature has been presented to a British Columbian writer who has published a book with significant social themes. The 2021 recipient was Geoff Mynett.

A wall plaque to commemorate George Ryga was installed in the newly-opened Summerland Library in October of 2015. In 2016 the Ryga Arts Festival, inspired by George Ryga, was started in Summerland and so far has continued through 2021. In 2020, a George Ryga archive was established at the Summerland Museum.

Bibliography
 Song of My Hands. 1956
 Hungry Hills.  1963
 Ballad of a Stone-Picker. 1966
 The Ecstasy of Rita Joe. 1970
 The Ecstasy of Rita Joe and Other Plays. 1971
 Sunrise on Sarah - 1973
 Night Desk. 1976
 Ploughman of the Glacier. 1977
 Seven Hours to Sundown. 1977
 Beyond the Crimson Morning. 1979
 Two Plays: Paracelsus and Prometheus Bound. 1982
 A Portrait of Angelica & A Letter to My Son. 1984
 In the Shadow of the Vulture. 1985
 The Athabasca Ryga - 1990
 Summerland. 1992
 George Ryga: The Other Plays. 2004 (edited by James Hoffman)
 George Ryga: The Prairie Novels. 2004 (edited by James Hoffman)

Further reading
 Subhash Chander: Canadian nationalism and George Ryga, a postcolonial perspective. Critique of Canadian nationalism in the plays of George Ryga. Lambert Academic Publishing LAP, Saarbrücken 2011
 Weronika Suchacka: "Za Hranetsiu" – "Beyond the Border". Constructions of Identities in Ukrainian‐Canadian Literature. (SALC Studies in Anglophone Literatures and Cultures) Wißner, Augsburg 2019 (about A Letter to My Son p 219-223)

Film
2009 - Hungry Hills2018 - Just a Ploughboy: A film about George Ryga'', written and directed by Gina Payzant Reel Mensch Studios, Edmonton, AB, Canada.

References

Further reading

External links
George Ryga & Associates
, entry in The Canadian Encyclopedia
 Ryga, item at Athabasca University, English-Canadian Writers, by Joseph J. Pivato
Ryga archives at University of Calgary
Ryga Festival Society
 
 

20th-century Canadian dramatists and playwrights
20th-century Canadian novelists
Canadian male novelists
1932 births
1987 deaths
Canadian people of Ukrainian descent
Canadian male dramatists and playwrights
20th-century Canadian male writers